The Ukrainian Women’s Cup Competition is a knockout cup competition for women's football clubs in Ukraine, run by the Football Federation of Ukraine.

Format
The format of this competition fluctuates annually. Mainly the competition is limited to the professional level clubs.

History
The first cup competition was held in 1992. The winner where Dynamo Kyiv who also won the national league that year.

Cup finals
The following is a list of all cup finals. The finals are played in a single leg. The only exception has been the very first 1992 final which was contested over two legs.

Performances
Achievements of clubs since 1992

Finals held at stadiums
13 – Bannikov Stadium, Kyiv
 6 – CSK ZSU Stadium, Kyiv
 2 – Dynamo Stadium, Kyiv
 2 – Olympiyskiy NSC, Kyiv
 2 – City Stadium, Ternopil
 1 – Mashynobudivnyk Stadium, Fastiv
 1 – Yuvileiny Stadium, Sumy
 1 – Skif Stadium, Lviv
 1 – Sonyachny Stadium, Kharkiv

See also 
 Football in Ukraine
 Ukrainian Women's League

References

External links 
Cup at Football Federation of Ukraine website 

Women's Cup
Cup
Ukr
Recurring sporting events established in 1992
1992 establishments in Ukraine